{{DISPLAYTITLE:F4 (mathematics)}}

In mathematics, F4 is the name of a Lie group and also its Lie algebra f4. It is one of the five exceptional simple Lie groups. F4 has rank 4 and dimension 52. The compact form is simply connected and its outer automorphism group is the trivial group. Its fundamental representation is 26-dimensional.

The compact real form of F4 is the isometry group of a 16-dimensional Riemannian manifold known as the octonionic projective plane OP2.  This can be seen systematically using a construction known as the magic square, due to Hans Freudenthal and Jacques Tits.

There are 3 real forms: a compact one, a split one, and a third one.  They are the isometry groups of the three real Albert algebras.

The F4 Lie algebra may be constructed by adding 16 generators transforming as a spinor to the 36-dimensional Lie algebra so(9), in analogy with the construction of E8.

In older books and papers, F4 is sometimes denoted by E4.

Algebra

Dynkin diagram
The Dynkin diagram for F4 is: .

Weyl/Coxeter group 
Its Weyl/Coxeter group  is the symmetry group of the 24-cell: it is a solvable group of order 1152. It has minimal faithful degree , which is realized by the action on the 24-cell.

Cartan matrix

F4 lattice 
The F4 lattice is a four-dimensional body-centered cubic lattice (i.e. the union of two hypercubic lattices, each lying in the center of the other). They form a ring called the Hurwitz quaternion ring.  The 24 Hurwitz quaternions of norm 1 form the vertices of a 24-cell centered at the origin.

Roots of F4 

The 48 root vectors of F4 can be found as the vertices of the 24-cell in two dual configurations, representing the vertices of a disphenoidal 288-cell if the edge lengths of the 24-cells are equal:

24-cell vertices: 
 24 roots by (±1, ±1, 0, 0), permuting coordinate positions

Dual 24-cell vertices: 
 8 roots by (±1, 0, 0, 0), permuting coordinate positions
 16 roots by (±1/2, ±1/2, ±1/2, ±1/2).

Simple roots

One choice of simple roots for F4, is given by the rows of the following matrix:

F4 polynomial invariant 
Just as O(n) is the group of automorphisms which keep the quadratic polynomials  invariant, F4 is the group of automorphisms of the following set of 3 polynomials in 27 variables. (The first can easily be substituted into other two making 26 variables).

Where x, y, z are real-valued and X, Y, Z are octonion valued. Another way of writing these invariants is as (combinations of) Tr(M), Tr(M2) and Tr(M3) of the hermitian octonion matrix:

The set of polynomials defines a 24-dimensional compact surface.

Representations
The characters of finite dimensional representations of the real and complex Lie algebras and Lie groups are all given by the Weyl character formula.  The dimensions of the smallest irreducible representations are :

1, 26, 52, 273, 324, 1053 (twice), 1274, 2652, 4096, 8424, 10829, 12376, 16302, 17901, 19278, 19448, 29172, 34749, 76076, 81081, 100776, 106496, 107406, 119119, 160056 (twice), 184756, 205751, 212992, 226746, 340119, 342056, 379848, 412776, 420147, 627912…

The 52-dimensional representation is the adjoint representation, and the 26-dimensional one is the trace-free part of the action of F4 on the exceptional Albert algebra of dimension 27.

There are two non-isomorphic irreducible representations of dimensions 1053, 160056, 4313088, etc.  The fundamental representations are those with dimensions 52, 1274, 273, 26 (corresponding to the four nodes in the Dynkin diagram in the order such that the double arrow points from the second to the third).

See also
 24-cell
 Albert algebra
 Cayley plane
 Dynkin diagram
 Fundamental representation
 Simple Lie group

References

 John Baez, The Octonions, Section 4.2: F4, Bull. Amer. Math. Soc. 39 (2002), 145-205. Online HTML version at http://math.ucr.edu/home/baez/octonions/node15.html.
 
 

Algebraic groups
Lie groups
Exceptional Lie algebras